Lentibacillus halodurans is a Gram-positive, moderately halophilic, rod-shaped and spore-forming bacterium from the genus of Lentibacillus which has been isolated from sediments from a neutral salt lake in Xin-Jiang.

References

Bacillaceae
Bacteria described in 2007